Daniel Minahan (born 1962) is an American television and film director and writer.

Minahan has directed several episodes of the HBO original series Six Feet Under, Deadwood, True Blood, The Newsroom and Game of Thrones; also The L Word and upcoming Fellow Travelers on Showtime and Grey's Anatomy on ABC. He also wrote and directed the independent film Series 7: The Contenders.

He was also the writer (and second unit director) for the 1996 film, I Shot Andy Warhol.

Career
Minahan joined the crew of the HBO western drama Deadwood as a director for the first season in 2004. The series was created by David Milch and focused on a growing town in the American West. Minahan directed the episodes "Suffer the Little Children" and "Mister Wu". He returned as a director for the second season in 2005 and helmed the episode "Advances, None Miraculous". He remained a director for the third and final season in 2006 and helmed the episode "A Two-Headed Beast". Minahan directed the 2019 film continuation of Deadwood.

Personal life
Minahan majored in Film and Video at the School of Visual Arts in Manhattan, where he graduated with a Bachelor of Fine Arts degree in 1987. He is openly gay.

Filmography

Television
Director

Film
Series 7: The Contenders (2001)
I Shot Andy Warhol (1996) co-wrote with director Mary Harron

References

External links
 

Place of birth missing (living people)
1962 births
Living people
American film directors
American television directors
American male screenwriters
Hugo Award winners
LGBT film directors
LGBT television directors
21st-century LGBT people
School of Visual Arts alumni